Jing'an Temple is the name of an interchange station between Lines 2, 7 and 14 of the Shanghai Metro. This station is located in Jing'an District, below the historic Jing'an Temple and the Jiu Guang shopping mall.

There are shuttle buses between Jing'an Temple and Hongqiao or Pudong airports. The shuttle bus from Pudong leaves the airport as 'Airport Bus Line 2' towards the 'Airport City Terminal' which is the official name of the Jingan Temple shuttle bus station and costs 22 ¥ as of January 2015. The ride takes about half an hour from Hongqiao Airport and 45–60 minutes depending on traffic from Pudong Airport. From Pudong the bus is usually faster and more convenient than the subway connection.

Incidents 
Thirteen people were injured in 2014 when an escalator connecting Line 2 and Line 7 malfunctioned. The upward-moving escalator's drive chain snapped during the morning rush hour, according to Shanghai Shentong Metro Group, the city's metro operator.

Places nearby

 Jing'an Temple
 Nanjing Road (W.)

Station Layout

Gallery

References

Shanghai Metro stations in Jing'an District
Line 2, Shanghai Metro
Line 7, Shanghai Metro
Railway stations in China opened in 1999
Railway stations in Shanghai
Line 14, Shanghai Metro